Andrea Dalla Costa (born , 1974) is an Italian visual artist, art director and film maker.

Biography 
Follow his artistic studies to ' Academy of Fine Arts of Venice and in 2005 he participated at the 51st Venice Biennale, the group Temperaturambiente inside the Italian pavilion, the same year he exhibited at '"Exposition des Italiens peintre à Paris", with the works cataloged edition "LEI".

In 2006 he was assistant to Archeoclub affresco and techniques of mural painting at the island of Lazaretto Novo in the Venetian Lagoon.
In 2010, follow the direction of hypermedia museum exhibition of the great exhibition "Mattia Bortoloni, Piazzetta, Giovanni Battista Tiepolo: the 'Veneto 700" at the Palace of oaks Rovigo ", in collaboration with Vittorio Sgarbi. With which one will win the 1st prize of the awards Mediastars.
The same year will be selected among the co-directors of the first social history of the movie Life in a Day, produced by Ridley Scott and directed by Oscar winner Kevin MacDonald; The project of crowdsourcing film attended by more than 80,000 video makers from 192 countries in the world, 344 of them will be chosen.

In 2011, participate in the second feature in crowdsourcing from Scott Free Productions, Britain in a Day, held in collaboration with the BBC in the UK.

Attended by more than 2,500 video-makers, will be selected from among the 312 co-directors of which he is the only Italian.
In 2013 he won the Musiclip Festival in Barcelona in the category of Best Director (Mejor Dirección Novel, 2013), with the videoclip of "Nuove prospettive" by Cristian Imparato. In 2014 directs the Giusi Merli actress in the short movie Giulia's keys (original title: Le note di Giulia).

In 2016 he participated in the TED (conference) of Castelfranco Veneto with his own speech "The modern storm", inspired by the opera The Tempest (Giorgione).

Works

Co-director & contributions 
2022 - VENEZIA il futuro del pianeta - producer National Geographic, Disney+
2021 -  Saving Venice - producer National Geographic UK, Disney+
2021 - Then and Now - Life in a Day 2020 - director Kevin Macdonald, producer Ridley Scott, YouTube
2020 - Lockdown Around the World (ducumentary) - producer National Geographic
2014 - The Giver (film) - director Phillip Noyce
2013 - Smile to the World - director Frédéric Viau-Davodeau
2012 - Britain in a Day - director Morgan Matthews (filmmaker), producer Ridley Scott, YouTube, BBC
2011 - Life in a Day - director Kevin Macdonald, producer Ridley Scott, YouTube, National Geographic
2011 - Buoncompleanno Italia 150° - director Giulio Questi, Sky Italia

Director 
2019 - Labirinti - iODiO (Music Clip)
2014 - Cristian Imparato - Soldatini di Piombo  (Music Clip)
2014 - Le note di Giulia (Short film) - illycaffè
2013 - Cristian Imparato - Nuove prospettive  (Music Clip)
2013 - L'aroma della perfezione (Short film) - illycaffè
2010 - La bottega di Mattia Bortoloni (Short film) - Fondazione Cariplo with Vittorio Sgarbi

Video installation 
2012 - "Autoritratto silente" - Algorithmic art - Theremin - Venice
2011 - "1second" - Rue de Miromesnil Paris
2011 - "K3 Film Festival" - Villach
2010 - "Bortoloni, Piazzetta, Tiepolo: il '700 veneto" - Art collections of Fondazione Cariplo - Rovigo
2010 - "No-Body" - Milan
2005 - "Tarot" - Rue de Miromesnil Paris

Books for children  
2022 - Super Isaia e i voli piripiripindarici 
2022 - Fata Natura e l'orto magico 
2019 - La principessa TIC e il pirata TAC 
2017 - Il volo perfetto di Massimo il folletto

References

External links 
 

1974 births
Living people
20th-century Italian painters
Italian male painters
21st-century Italian painters
Italian film directors
Accademia di Belle Arti di Venezia alumni
20th-century Italian male artists
21st-century Italian male artists